Kentucky Route 76 (KY 76) is a  state highway in Kentucky that runs from a boat ramp on Lake Cumberland west of Jabez to KY 70 northeast of Elk Horn via Eli, Neatsville, Knifley, and Yuma.

Route description 
After it begins on the shore of Lake Cumberland, KY 76 goes into a northwesterly path towards Salem. It intersects KY 910 and goes over an overpass that carries the highway over the Louie B. Nunn Cumberland Parkway before intersecting KY 80. KY 76 enters Adair County, where it has a junction with Kentucky Routes 206 and 551 in the communities of Neatsville and Knifley, respectively. It enters Taylor County, and meets its northern terminus at its junction with KY 70 at Elk Horn, just east of Campbellsville.

History 
KY 76 was originally an east-west highway going from KY 70 at Elk Horn to KY 206 at Neatsville, but follows a path into Casey County where it met US 127 at Dunnville.
 KY 76 has long been rerouted to its current length and path at some point around 1962-63.

Major intersections

References

0076
Transportation in Adair County, Kentucky
Transportation in Russell County, Kentucky
Transportation in Taylor County, Kentucky